Thorleifur Úlfarsson (born 27 December 2000) is an Icelandic professional footballer who plays as a forward for the Houston Dynamo in Major League Soccer.

Career

Youth and domestic
Thorleifur began playing with Breiðablik at age 6. From 2016 to 2018, he joined the Stjarnan youth ranks, but returned to Breiðablik in 2018. Thorleifur spent time on loan at Augnablik during the 2019 and 2020 seasons, where he made 21 appearances and scored 10 goals in the 3. deild karla, the 4th tier of Icelandic football.  He also was loaned to Víkingur Ólafsvík for parts of the 2020 and 2021 seasons, where he scored 2 goals in 11 appearances in the 1. deild karla.  Thorleifur made 3 first team appearances for his boyhood club Breiðablik, 2 in the League Cup and 1 in the Úrvalsdeild before leaving for Duke.

College
In February 2021, Thorleifur joined the Duke Blue Devils to play college soccer in the United States. During one and a half seasons with the Blue Devils, he scored nineteen goals and had 2 assists in twenty five matches. Following his first half-season, he was named the team's Most Valuable Offensive Player and was named to the Atlantic Coast Conference (ACC) All-Freshman Team, All-ACC Academic Team, and ACC Academic Honor Roll. Following the 2021 season, he was named ACC Offensive Player of the Year, was a MAC Hermann Trophy semifinalist, and was named Duke Most Valuable Offensive Player. He was also named to the United Soccer Coaches All-American First Team and All-ACC First Team. Following his sophomore year at Duke, it was announced that Thorleifur had signed a Generation Adidas contract with Major League Soccer ahead of the 2022 MLS SuperDraft.

Professional 
On 11 January 2022, Thorleifur was selected with the fourth overall pick by the Houston Dynamo in the 2022 MLS SuperDraft. He made his Dynamo debut on 27 February 2022, coming off the bench in the 81st minute during a 0–0 draw against Real Salt Lake in Houston's opening match of the season.  He scored his first goal for the Dynamo on 22 May, helping Houston to a 3–0 win over the LA Galaxy. Thorleifur finished his rookie season with 4 goals and 1 assist in 31 MLS appearances, 11 of them starts.  It was a disappointing season for the Dynamo as a team, missing out on the playoffs after finishing 13th in the Western Conference.

Career statistics

Personal life 
Thorleifur was born in Reykjavík, Iceland to Úlfar Helgason and Gudfinna Kristofersdottir and was raised in the neighboring town of Kópavogur.  He has 2 brothers and 1 sister.  Thorleifur is a fan of English club Manchester United, with Cristiano Ronaldo being his favorite player.

References

External links

Duke Blue Devils profile

2000 births
Living people
Thorleifur Úlfarsson
Thorleifur Úlfarsson
Association football forwards
Úrvalsdeild karla (football) players
1. deild karla players
All-American men's college soccer players
Expatriate soccer players in the United States
Thorleifur Úlfarsson
Duke Blue Devils men's soccer players
Sportspeople from Reykjavík
Icelandic expatriate footballers
Houston Dynamo FC players
Houston Dynamo FC draft picks
Major League Soccer players